Rai Premium is an Italian free-to-air television channel that broadcasts reruns of popular fiction and films that were produced by State-owned broadcaster RAI.

Logos

References

Premium
Television channels and stations established in 2003
Italian-language television stations